The 1932 Ice Hockey European Championship was the 17th edition of the ice hockey tournament for European countries associated to the International Ice Hockey Federation.  This was the last time it was played independent of the World Hockey Championships, or the Olympics.  

The tournament was played between March 14 and March 20, 1932, in Berlin, Germany, and Sweden won their fourth title.  The top two teams from each group were supposed to advance to a six-team final round.  However, all three teams in group A finished tied so a compromise was reached that allowed them all to advance.  There was not enough time to play a round with seven teams so the other two second-place teams (France and Great Britain) agreed to play in the consolation round instead.

First round

Group A

March 14

March 15

March 16

Standings Group A

Group B

March 14

March 15

March 16

Standings Group B

Group C

March 14

March 15

March 16

Standings Group C

Consolation round 6-9 Place

March 17

March 18

Standings Consolation round

Notes
Carried over from First Round: France 1 Latvia 0; G. Britain 1 Romania 0

Final round

March 17

March 18

March 19

March 20

Standings Final Round

Notes
Carried over from First Round: Germany 1 Switzerland 1; Switzerland 2 Austria 2; Germany 1 Austria 1

Top Goalscorer

Gerry Davey (G. Britain), 7 goals

References
 Euro Championship 1932

European Championship 
1932
Ice Hockey European Championships
Ice Hockey European Championship
1930s in Berlin
Sports competitions in Berlin